HMS Antigua (K501) was a Colony-class frigate of the United Kingdom in commission from 1943 to 1945  that served during World War II. She originally was ordered by the United States Navy as the Tacoma-class patrol frigate USS Hamond (PF-73) and was transferred prior to completion.

Construction and acquisition
The ship, originally designated a "patrol gunboat," PG-181, was ordered by the United States Maritime Commission under a United States Navy contract as USS Hamond. Laid down by the Walsh-Kaiser Company at Providence, Rhode Island, on 3 April 1943, she was reclassified as a "patrol frigate," PF-73, on 15 April 1943. Intended for transfer to the United Kingdom, the ship was renamed Antigua by the British prior to launching and was launched on 26 July 1943, sponsored by Mrs. Louise M. Reddick .

Service history
Transferred to the United Kingdom under Lend-Lease on 4 November 1943, the ship served in the Royal Navy as HMS Antigua (K501) on patrol and escort duty until 1945.

Disposal
The United Kingdom returned Antigua to the United States on 2 May 1946. She soon was sold to the Sun Shipbuilding and Drydock Company of Chester, Pennsylvania, for scrapping.

References 
Notes

Bibliography
 
 Navsource Online: Frigate Photo Archive HMS Antigua (K 501) ex-Hamond ex-PF-73 ex-PG-181

External links
Photo gallery of HMS Antigua

1943 ships
Ships built in Providence, Rhode Island
Tacoma-class frigates
Colony-class frigates
World War II frigates and destroyer escorts of the United States
World War II frigates of the United Kingdom